{{Automatic taxobox
| fossil_range = Aptian~
| display_parents = 2
| taxon = Opallionectes
| authority = Kear 2006
| subdivision_ranks = Species
| subdivision = 
 O. andamookaensis 
}}Opallionectes andamookaensis (meaning "the opal swimmer from Andamooka") is the name given to a 5 m (16 ft) long plesiosaur, which is thought to have lived during the early Cretaceous period (Lower middle Aptian), 115 million years ago, in shallow seas covering what is now Australia.

 Description 
An opalized partial skeleton (including vertebrae, ribs, limb elements, teeth, and associated gastroliths) of the animal has been discovered in an opal mine in the Bulldog Shale at Andamooka in South Australia and described by Kear in 2006. It had fine needle like sharp teeth similar to those of nothosaurs and were probably used to trap small prey such as fish and squids. It is considered a sort of missing link between the much older plesiosaurs, living 165 million years ago, and the ones near the end of the Cretaceous, 66 million years ago, between which there had been a gap in the fossil record. Analyses of the sedimentary structures, fossils, isotope data and climatic modeling show that Opallionectes'' lived in a region characterized by seasonally cold (possibly freezing) conditions, suggesting that it had developed some adaptation to live in cold water, such as seasonal migration or elevated metabolism.

See also 
 List of plesiosaur genera
 Timeline of plesiosaur research

References

Bibliography 
 

Cryptoclidids
Early Cretaceous plesiosaurs
Plesiosauria incertae sedis
Early Cretaceous reptiles of Australia
Plesiosaurs of Oceania
Aptian life
Opals
Fossils of Australia
Fossil taxa described in 2006
Sauropterygian genera